Phenylalanyl-tRNA synthetase, mitochondrial (FARS2) is an enzyme that in humans is encoded by the FARS2 gene. This protein encoded by FARS2 localizes to the mitochondrion and plays a role in mitochondrial protein translation. Mutations in this gene have been associated with combined oxidative phosphorylation deficiency 14, also known as Alpers encephalopathy, as well as spastic paraplegia 77 and infantile-onset epilepsy and cytochrome c oxidase deficiency.

Structure 
FARS2 is located on the p arm of chromosome 6 in position 25.1 and has 15 exons. This gene encodes a member of the class-II aminoacyl-tRNA synthetase family. FARS2 is a phenylalanine-tRNA synthetase (PheRS) localized to the mitochondrion which consists of a single polypeptide chain, unlike the (alpha-beta)2 structure of the prokaryotic and eukaryotic cytoplasmic forms of PheRS. Structure analysis and catalytic properties indicate mitochondrial PheRSs may constitute a class of PheRS distinct from the enzymes found in prokaryotes and in the eukaryotic cytoplasm.

Function 
Aminoacyl-tRNA synthetases are a class of enzymes that charge tRNAs with their cognate amino acids. FARS2 charges tRNA(Phe) with phenylalanine and catalyzes direct attachment of m-Tyr (an oxidized version of Phe) to tRNA(Phe). This makes it important for mitochondrial translation and for delivery of the misacylated tRNA to the ribosome and incorporation of ROS-damaged amino acid into proteins. Alternative splicing results in multiple transcript variants.

Catalytic activity 
ATP + L-phenylalanine + tRNA(Phe) = AMP + diphosphate + L-phenylalanyl-tRNA(Phe)

Clinical significance 
Mutations in FARS2 have been associated to combined oxidative phosphorylation deficiency 14, spastic paraplegia 77, and infantile-onset epilepsy and cytochrome c oxidase deficiency. Both combined oxidative phosphorylation deficiency 14 and spastic paraplegia 77 are autosomal recessive in nature and have been linked to several pathogenic variants including Y144C, I329T, D391V, and D142Y. Combined oxidative phosphorylation deficiency 14 is characterized by neonatal onset of global developmental delay, refractory seizures, lactic acidosis, and deficiencies of multiple mitochondrial respiratory enzymes. Spastic paraplegia, meanwhile, is a neurodegenerative disorder characterized by a slow, gradual, progressive weakness and spasticity of the lower limbs, with patients often exhibiting difficulty with balance, weakness and stiffness in the legs, muscle spasms, and dragging the toes when walking. One case of infantile-onset epilepsy and cytochrome c oxidase deficiency resulting from a FARS2 Asp325Tyr missense mutation has also been reported. Early-onset epilepsy, neurological deficits, and complex IV deficiency are the main characteristics of the disease stemming from this mutation.

Interactions 

FARS2 has been shown to have 193 binary protein-protein interactions including 12 co-complex interactions. FARS2 appears to interact with RCBTB2, KRTAP10-9, CALCOCO2, KRT40, MID2, APPL1, IKZF3, KRT13, TADA2A, STX11, TRIM27, KRTAP10-5, KRTAP10-7, TFCP2, MKRN3, KRT31, HMBOX1, AGTRAP, ADAMTSL4, NOTCH2NL, CMTM5, TRIM54, FSD2, CYSRT1, HIGD1C, homez, SPRY1, ZNF500, KRT34, YIF1A, BAG4, TPM2, SYP, KRTAP10-8, KRTAP1-1, AP1B1, TRAF2, GRB10, MESD, TRIP6, CCDC152, BEX5, FHL5, MORN3, DGAT2L6, ZNF438, KCTD17, ZNF655, BANP, SPERT, NFKBID, ZNF526, PCSK5, DVL3, AJUBA, PPP1R16B, MDFI, DPH2, CDCA4, KRTAP3-3, BACH2, KCNF1, MAN1C1, RIMBP3, ZRANB1, ISY1, FKBP7, and E7.

References

Further reading

External links 

Nuclear Gene-Encoded Leigh Syndrome Overview
Mitochondrial DNA-Associated Leigh Syndrome and NARP